Sivudu Sivudu Sivudu is a 1983 Telugu film directed by A. Kodandarami Reddy. The film stars Chiranjeevi, Radhika, Jaggayya, and Rao Gopal Rao in important roles. The film was a Box office Disaster.

Plot 
Chiranjeevi is a downtrodden villager named Sivudu who just wants to live in his small world with his lady love (Radhika), but falls prey to the oppressors who are wealthy and powerful, who beat him almost to death and kill his lover. He is rescued by a Guru (Jaggaiah), who trains him like a soldier and names him Sivudu to fight the Diwan Rao Gopal Rao under the Jamindar Gollapudi Maruti Rao and his tyrannic daughter (Radhika in a dual role) who thinks she has Blue Blood. Sivudu's aim is to rescue the villagers from a secret place where they all are help captive and also get rid of the Diwan and restore peace. Radhika later learns that she is the daughter of Guru, but not of Jamindar and falls for Sivudu. The rest of plot is about how Sivudu succeeds in his mission.

Cast 
 Chiranjeevi
 Radhika Sarathkumar
 Jaggayya
 Rao Gopal Rao
 Maruthirao Gollapudi

Soundtrack 
The soundtrack was composed by K. Chakravarthy

References

External links 

1983 films
1980s Telugu-language films
Films scored by K. Chakravarthy
Films directed by A. Kodandarami Reddy